Looking for Fun, released as For Fun in the U.S., is a 1992 Chinese comedy film directed by Ning Ying, written by Ning Ying and her sister Ning Dai, and based on a novella by Zheng Jiangong (which was translated into English by Jeanne Tai in 1989). The film is about a group of retirees in Beijing who try to find some sense of belonging and purpose by organizing a Peking opera troupe.

Looking for Fun won Gold Award at the 1993 Tokyo International Film Festival, Golden Montgolfiere and Best Actor (Huang Zongluo) at the 1993 Nantes Three Continents Festival, Best Director and Best Actor (Huang) at the 1993 Thessaloniki Film Festival, and Best New Director at the 1993 San Sebastián International Film Festival.

References

External links

Films about Peking opera
Films set in Beijing
Films shot in Beijing
Films directed by Ning Ying
Films based on Chinese novels
Chinese comedy films
Beijing Film Studio films
1992 comedy films
1992 films